William C. Payne (c. 1841 - November 3, 1898) was a state legislator in Arkansas. He represented  Jefferson County, Arkansas in 1879 and 1881.

He died November 3, 1898 in a police wagon after falling sick on 9th Street in Little Rock, Arkansas and the police were called.
He was picked up by a police patrol wagon but died before they reached the hospital around 1:30 in the morning; an inquest found the cause to be heart disease.
At the time of his death he was living in Rob Roy where he was returned to be buried.

See also
African-American officeholders during and following the Reconstruction era

References

1840s births
Year of birth uncertain
1898 deaths
Reconstruction Era
Members of the Arkansas House of Representatives